V. Nagaraj (Tamil: வி. நாகராஜ்) (born 20 November 1962) also known as Director Naga, is a prominent Malaysian director, producer, distributor and consultant.

Career
Director Naga has been in the local cinema field since 1984. He has created popular Malay language films such as Ghazal untuk Rabiah, Getaran, Iskandar and Siapa Tak Sayang Bini.

In his early days Director Naga has also produced many Malay language films under the company S.V Productions. His produced films are Gila-Gila Remaja (1985), Mati Hidup Semula, Sejati,
Awang Spanar, OS Kembar Siam, Femina, Ghazal untuk Rabiah, Jejaka Perasan, Rimba Malam, Adik, Sepi Itu Indah, Keluarga 99, Mr. OS, Simponi Duniaku, Sahabat,
OK, Hero, Getaran and Iskandar.

Director Naga entered the Malaysian Tamil film industry in 2004. He has done television series for TV stations like RTM & Astro. One of his TV series, Oru Thayin Kanavu (A Mother’s Dream), was nominated in several categories in the Sri Angkasa RTM 2007 Awards.

V. Nagaraj has also directed Digital Screening Movies such as Aathma (Soul), a horror thriller. This movie was produced under Demaz Entertainment Sdn. Bhd. and showed in the theatres on 19 July 2007. This movie was a great success and gave him the boost he needed in the Malaysian Tamil film industry. His second Digital Screening Movie was Ivanthanda Hero presented by GV Media Broadcast Sdn. Bhd. This movie was released in the beginning of 2008. His third Digital Screening Movie was Uruvam produced by Minjan Production Sdn. Bhd. This movie was released end of 2008. Then, he gave another successful Digital Screening titled Undercover Rascals in 2010 under his own production Megamovie Sdn. Bhd.

Director Naga has now returned to the Malay film industry with his Gila-Gila Remaja...kembali dengan nadi yang baru (2012), which he directed and produced under his company Megamovie Sdn.Bhd. Gila-Gila Remaja...kembali dengan nadi yang baru will soon be released in mid-2012.

Director Naga was awarded as the BEST PROMISING DIRECTOR for GHAZAL UNTUK RABIAH and the said movie was awarded as the BEST COMEDY MOVIE. It was also awarded for LAGU TERBAIK in ANUGERAH SCREEN TV3. In addition, V. Nagaraj was NOMINATED for BEST DIRECTOR AWARD IN SRI ANGKASA for TV2 Tamil Drama “ORU THAYIN KANAVU” (20EPS) in 2007. Besides that, V. Nagaraj was also awarded as BEST DIGITAL MOVIE DIRECTOR IN MTA AWARDS 2007 for AATHMA. Aathma also won BEST DIGITAL MOVIE in Film Festival Malaysia. He was also awarded Most Popular Director in the Raaga Astro Awards 2010. Director V. Nagaraj`s Uruvam was nominated in the Japan SKIP CITY INTERNATIONAL D-Cinema FESTIVAL 2010.

He gave a kick start in 2012 by winning the Best Director award in the Malaysian Indian Film Festival which was held in Chennai.

Filmography

Director

Writer

Camera and Electrical Department

References

External links
 

1962 births
Living people
People from Selangor
Malaysian film directors
Malaysian film producers
Malaysian people of Indian descent
Malay-language film directors